William Rupert McCourt  (1884 – 17 February 1947) was an Australian public servant who served as Clerk of the New South Wales Legislative Assembly.

Family and education
McCourt was born in Moss Vale, New South Wales the son of William McCourt MLA (1851–1913), a former Speaker of the NSW Legislative Assembly. He was educated at Newington College in Sydney from 1899 until 1901.

Public and war service
Upon leaving school in 1901, McCourt joined the staff of the Parliament of New South Wales and served in a number of positions before serving as Clerk of the NSW Legislative Assembly from 1930 until 1947. He served as a Lieutenant in World War I and at war's end he and the then second clerk of the Assembly were seconded to the staff of the House of Commons of the United Kingdom for some months.

Honours and travel
McCourt was made a Companion of the Order of St Michael and St George in 1937 in recognition of his services to the New South Wales Parliament. In that year he officially attended the Coronation of King George VI in London.

References

1884 births
1947 deaths
People educated at Newington College
Australian Companions of the Order of St Michael and St George